Jamaican National Badminton Championships are officially held since the year 1937.  After the first edition the tournament paused for 13 years.

Past winners

Junior champions

References 
Senior champions
Junior champions

Badminton tournaments in Jamaica
National badminton championships
Badminton
Recurring sporting events established in 1937